Pınarcık is a village in the Derik District of Mardin Province in Turkey. The village is populated by Kurds of the Rutan tribe and had a population of 47 in 2021.

References 

Villages in Derik District
Kurdish settlements in Mardin Province